Carl Ingwart Theodor Rynning (1837–1892) was a Norwegian government official and politician.  He served as the County Governor of Finnmarken county from 1882 until 1885. He was also a representative in the Parliament of Norway from 1883 to 1885, representing Finnmark county.

References

1837 births
1892 deaths
County governors of Norway
Members of the Storting